Early Hits of 1965, subtitled A Million Dollars Worth of Music!!! Played by the Greatest Organist Ever, is an album by Billy Preston performing soul arrangements of hit singles from that year recorded in the same sessions of The Most Exciting Organ Ever and originally released by the Vee-Jay label and re-released by Exodus Records the following year.

Track listing
"Stop! In the Name of Love" (Holland–Dozier–Holland) – 2:26
"The Birds and the Bees" (Barry Stuart) – 1:59
"Goldfinger" (John Barry, Leslie Bricusse, Anthony Newley) – 2:20
"King of the Road" (Roger Miller) – 2:12
"You've Lost That Lovin' Feelin'" (Phil Spector, Barry Mann, Cynthia Weil) – 2:20
"My Girl" (Smokey Robinson, Ronald White)
"Eight Days a Week" (John Lennon, Paul McCartney) – 2:10
"Ferry Cross the Mersey" (Gerry Marsden) – 2:52
"Downtown" (Tony Hatch) – 2:40
"Can't You Hear My Heartbeat?" (John Carter, Ken Lewis) – 2:02
"Go Now" (Larry Banks, Milton Bernett)  – 2:45
"Shotgun" (Autry DeWalt) – 2:30

References 

Billy Preston albums
1965 albums
Exodus Records albums
Vee-Jay Records albums